Ummathoor is a village near Civil Station in the state of Kerala, India.

Description
Ummathoor takes its name from a small bushy plant called Ummathunkaya that grows in the area.

The village is near the Anankkadavu palam bridge. People of Ummathoor are very healthy and hard working, owing to the terrain where they live.

Ummathoor is near Civil station but does not fall under the Malappuram municipality.

Suburbs of Malappuram